Malo (also known as Temotu Neo) is an island in the Solomon Islands; it is located in Temotu Province. The large neighbouring island is Nendö.

Environment
Malo, along with neighbouring Nendö, has been identified by BirdLife International as an Important Bird Area (IBA) because it supports a population of the endemic Santa Cruz shrikebills, also known as the Nendo Shrikebill. Potential threats to the site come from logging and cyclones.

References

Islands of the Solomon Islands
Important Bird Areas of the Solomon Islands